Goldie Vance is a comic book series created by Eisner award winning writer Hope Larson and artist Brittney Williams. It was a monthly ongoing series from 2016 to 2017, then switched to a series of original graphic novels in 2018. In 2019, the comic's publisher, Boom! Studios, partnered with Little, Brown Books to continue Goldie Vance as a series of novels for young readers. The series centers on Marigold "Goldie" Vance, the sixteen-year-old daughter of the manager of a Miami resort, whose dream is to become the resort's in-house detective.

Plot

Volume One
The first volume centers around Goldie searching a necklace reported missing by guest Dieter Lugwig, uncovering a plot to escape Russian agents and sell NASA a brand new formula for rocket fuel.

Volume Two
In the second volume, Goldie and Cheryl encounter a woman in an astronaut suit washed up on a beach. Cheryl and the woman vanish shortly thereafter, and Goldie tracks their trail leading to a mysterious rogue astronaut training program.

Volume Three
Sugar Maple, Goldie's longtime rival, recruits her to find out who is sabotaging her prize race car before the big race she'll be competing in.

Volume Four
Bands are missing and need to be found before the town's big music festival.

Characters
 Marigold "Goldie" Vance: The sixteen-year-old protagonist of the series. Goldie is a car valet at the Crossed Palms Resort who volunteers her services as its detective. She is skilled in discovering clues, driving and repairing cars, disguises, making friends, and breaking rules.
 Cheryl Lebeaux: Goldie's best friend, who works at the front desk of the hotel. She is a bookworm and studying to become an astronaut.
 Walter Tooey: The hired detective at Crossed Palms. He is frequently exasperated by Goldie's hijacking of his job but grudgingly tolerates her for the results she gets.
 Arthur Vance: Goldie's father, and the manager of Crossed Palms. He is professional and seeks to keep the staff constantly busy.
 Sylvia Bell: A mermaid swimmer at the local club. She and Mr. Vance are divorced. It is unclear if she has kept her married name or returned to her maiden name after her divorce from Goldie's dad.
 Rob: Another valet at the hotel. He is frequently nervous and desperate and has shown to have a crush on Cheryl.
 Diane: A record seller at Wax Lips Records & Goldie's girlfriend after helping her on the necklace case.
 Sugar Maple: The daughter of Mr. Maple, the owner of Crossed Palms. She is rich, a competitive racer, and very hot-tempered. She and Goldie have been bitter rivals ever since they were children. But they were friends once before Goldie won a race and Sugar Maple decided she didn't want to be friends with Goldie

Books

Film
Simpson Street for 20th Century Studios will produce a movie based on the comic. Rashida Jones will write and direct the movie, while Kerry Washington will produce it.

References

American comics
Boom! Studios titles
LGBT-related comics
2016 comics debuts
2018 graphic novels